Sergio Rico González (born 1 September 1993) is a Spanish professional footballer who plays as a goalkeeper for Ligue 1 club Paris Saint-Germain.

He began his career at Sevilla, where he twice won the Europa League while appearing in 170 competitive matches. He signed with Paris Saint-Germain in 2019, initially on loan, and permanently in 2020.

Rico made his senior international debut for Spain in 2016, and was chosen for the year's European Championship.

Club career

Sevilla
Rico was born in Seville, Andalusia. He played youth football with Sevilla, spending several of his first seasons as a senior with the reserves, in Segunda División B. On 1 July 2013, he signed a new two-year deal with the club.

On 14 September 2014, profiting from the injuries of both Beto and Mariano Barbosa, Rico made his first-team – and La Liga – debut, starting in a 2–0 home win against Getafe. He first appeared in the UEFA Europa League four days later, playing the full 90 minutes in a home victory over Feyenoord for the same scoreline.

In December 2014, Rico was definitely promoted to the main squad, overtaking Barbosa in the pecking order. He extended his contract with the Rojiblancos on the 16th, signing until 2017 and being awarded a place with the first team. He finished the campaign with 37 appearances in all competitions, including 11 in the Europa League which concluded with a 3–2 defeat of Dnipro in the final.

In 2015–16, Rico played in Sevilla's UEFA Champions League group stage elimination, but was replaced by fellow youth graduate David Soria as the team went on to win a third consecutive Europa League title. He was still first choice during 2017–18, but was also involved in altercations with manager Vincenzo Montella and a group of supporters.

On 9 August 2018, Rico was loaned to Fulham for one season. He made his Premier League debut on 27 October, in a 0–3 home loss against Bournemouth. He edged out homegrown player Marcus Bettinelli as the starter for the West London club, who were relegated to the Championship at the end of the campaign.

Paris Saint-Germain
On 1 September 2019, Rico joined Paris Saint-Germain on a season-long loan deal which included an optional buyout clause. His maiden appearance in Ligue 1 took place two months later in the 2–1 victory at Brest, when Keylor Navas withdrew injured before kick-off.

On 29 June 2020, after the campaign had been halted due to the COVID-19 pandemic, Rico signed a two-month contract extension at the Parc des Princes. On 12 August, he came on as a substitute for the injured Navas late into an eventual 2–1 win over Atalanta in the quarter-finals of the Champions League, and kept his place the following round against RB Leipzig (3–0 victory).

Rico signed a permanent four-year contract on 5 September 2020, the transfer fee being of €6 million. After the arrival of Gianluigi Donnarumma in July 2021, however, he was demoted to the role of third-choice.

On 21 January 2022, Rico returned to Spain to join Mallorca on loan until the end of the season. He made his debut on 2 February, in a 1–0 loss at Rayo Vallecano in the quarter-finals of the Copa del Rey. He quickly became the starter, overtaking veteran Manolo Reina; however, after conceding six goals against relegation rivals Granada on 7 May, he returned to the bench.

International career
On 26 May 2015, Rico and Sevilla teammate Aleix Vidal were the two players called up to the Spanish national team for the first time, ahead of a friendly with Costa Rica and a UEFA Euro 2016 qualifying match against Belarus, but he did not play in either fixture. He was the third-choice goalkeeper for the final tournament behind Iker Casillas and David de Gea, and made his debut on 1 June, replacing the former for the final 14 minutes of a 6–1 friendly win over South Korea in Salzburg.

Personal life
In December 2016, Rico was given the Sport award at the Young Andalusia Prizes, receiving his honour from regional president Susana Díaz, a fan of city rivals Real Betis.

During a match between PSG and Montpellier on 22 January 2021, Rico's home in Neuilly-sur-Seine was burgled. His father died in March, and teammate Navas dedicated his penalty save against Barcelona in the Champions League round of 16 to him.

Career statistics

Club

Honours
Sevilla
UEFA Europa League: 2014–15, 2015–16

Paris Saint-Germain
Ligue 1: 2019–20, 2021–22
Coupe de France: 2019–20, 2020–21
Coupe de la Ligue: 2019–20
Trophée des Champions: 2020
UEFA Champions League runner-up: 2019–20

Notes

References

External links

1993 births
Living people
Spanish footballers
Footballers from Seville
Association football goalkeepers
La Liga players
Segunda División B players
Sevilla Atlético players
Sevilla FC players
RCD Mallorca players
Premier League players
Fulham F.C. players
Ligue 1 players
Paris Saint-Germain F.C. players
UEFA Europa League winning players
Spain international footballers
UEFA Euro 2016 players
Spanish expatriate footballers
Expatriate footballers in England
Expatriate footballers in France
Spanish expatriate sportspeople in England
Spanish expatriate sportspeople in France